Glaucocharis infundella is a moth in the family Crambidae. It was described by Wang and Sung in 1988. It is found in China (Sichuan).

References

Diptychophorini
Moths described in 1988